The Constitutional Court of Bosnia and Herzegovina is the interpreter and guardian of the Constitution of Bosnia and Herzegovina, It has the appellate jurisdiction over issues arising out of a judgment of any other court in the country, including the constitutional courts of the two entities and the  Court of Bosnia and Herzegovina.

History
Bosnia and Herzegovina provides a rare example of a country in transition from a socialist system which nevertheless has a history of having a constitutional court, since the former Yugoslavia was the only country which had a system of the constitutional courts already in socialist regime. The first Constitutional Court in former Yugoslavia was created as early as 1963. This date coincided with the starting point of the history of a constitutional court in Bosnia and Herzegovina. In accordance with the federal structure of the former SFRY, not only was there a Constitutional Court at the federal level, but prior to the dissolution of former Yugoslavia, the six Republics and even the two Autonomous Provinces – Kosovo and Vojvodina – also had their own Constitutional Courts.

The Constitutional Court of Bosnia and Herzegovina was established for the first time on 15 February 1964 pursuant to the Constitution of 1963. Its existence was confirmed in the Constitution of 1974. The jurisdiction of this Constitutional Court consisted primarily of an abstract normative control. Thus, it would take decisions as to the conformity of the (Republic’s) laws with the Constitution, and as to the constitutionality and legality of other regulations and general and self-management acts. It would also be called upon to resolve disputes between the Republic and other political-territorial units, in particular, conflicts of jurisdiction as between the courts and other bodies of political-territorial units. The 'Law on the Constitutional Court' regulated issues concerning the organization, jurisdiction and procedures before this Constitutional Court.

The role and jurisdiction of the Constitutional court was redefined in the Dayton Peace Agreement (Annex IV - Constitution of Bosnia and Herzegovina, Article VI).

Jurisdiction
In general, the jurisdiction of the Constitutional Court is defined under Article VI.3 and Article IV.3 of the Constitution. Within its overriding duty to 'uphold' the Constitution of Bosnia and Herzegovina, it consists of five types of jurisdiction. The proceedings to be followed and type of decision to be given will depend upon the type concerned and the nature of the case.

Essentially, the distinction between these various types of jurisdiction is based on the extent to which the Constitutional Court, in addition to the classical task of upholding constitutionality, also has, in certain types of disputes, a more direct relation with the judicial or legislative authority concerned.

Disputes arising under conflict of jurisdiction and an abstract review of constitutionality
Disputes arising under conflict of jurisdiction
The Constitutional Court has exclusive jurisdiction to decide any dispute that arises under the Constitution between the Entities or between Bosnia and Herzegovina and an Entity or Entities, or between institutions of Bosnia and Herzegovina. In effect, the Court has to decide on positive or negative conflicts of jurisdiction, or any other disputes that may arise under relations between the state and entity authority and/or the institutions of Bosnia and Herzegovina.

Review of constitutionality of laws
The Constitutional Court has jurisdiction over issues whether any provision of an Entity's constitution or a law of an Entity is compatible with the Constitution of Bosnia and Herzegovina.

Although, the Constitution of Bosnia and Herzegovina explicitly focuses only on 'provisions of an Entity's law', this also implies a review of constitutionality of laws of Bosnia and Herzegovina in accordance with the general task of the Court to uphold the Constitution of Bosnia and Herzegovina.

In special cases, the Court also has jurisdiction to examine whether an Entity's decision to establish a special parallel relationship with a neighboring state is consistent with the Constitution including provisions concerning the sovereignty and territorial integrity of Bosnia and Herzegovina.

Referral of disputes
In both presented cases, under the Constitution, disputes may be referred only by the following authorized parties: a member of the Presidency, the Chair of the Council of Ministers, the Chair or a Deputy Chair of either chamber of the Parliamentary Assembly, one-fourth of the members of either chamber of the Parliamentary Assembly, or one-fourth of either chamber of a legislature of an Entity.

Appellate jurisdiction
The appellate jurisdiction of the Constitutional Court is established by the constitutional provision according to which the Constitutional Court "shall have appellate jurisdiction over issues under this Constitution arising out of a judgement of any other court in Bosnia and Herzegovina".

This implies that the Constitutional Court is the highest judicial body in the land. This confirms its role as being a special institutional safe-guard for the protection of the rights and freedoms enshrined in the Constitution.

This provision is effected through the Rules of the Constitutional Court so the Court, if it finds an appeal well-founded, may act in one of two ways: the Court may act as a court of full jurisdiction and it may decide on the merits or it may quash the challenged decision and refer the case back to the court that adopted the judgement for renewed proceedings. The court whose decision has been quashed is required to take another decision in expedient proceedings and, in doing so, it shall be bound by the legal opinion of the Constitutional Court concerning the violation of the appellant’s rights and the fundamental freedoms guaranteed under the Constitution.

Appellants, who believe that the judgement or other decision of any court is in violation of their rights, have the right to lodge an appeal after all legal remedies have been exhausted while the Court shall also consider the effectiveness of possible legal remedies.

Referral of an issue by other courts
The Constitutional Court has jurisdiction over issues referred by any court in Bosnia and Herzegovina concerning whether a law, on whose validity its decision depends, is compatible with this Constitution, with the European Convention on Human Rights and its Protocols, or with the laws of Bosnia and Herzegovina; or concerning the existence of or the scope of a general rule of public international law.

In general, the Constitutional Court may uphold a law pertinent to the lower court's decision or proclaim it invalid. The latter shall be required to proceed pursuant to the decision of the Constitutional Court.

Unblocking of the Parliamentary Assembly
The jurisdiction of the Constitutional Court in the case of 'blockage' of the work of the House of Peoples of the Parliamentary Assembly of Bosnia and Herzegovina concerning an issue of destructiveness to the vital interest of constituent peoples, represents in many ways a typical area of activity of a constitutional court, as this represents a close 'interface' between the "judicial" and "legislative" authorities.

The Constitutional Court here resolves a dispute in which a proposed decision of the Parliamentary Assembly, according to the opinion of a majority of the delegates representing any of the three constituent peoples in the House of Peoples, is considered to be destructive to the vital national interest, whilst at the same time all 'parliamentary means' for the resolution of this issue in the House of Peoples have been exhausted.

Composition of the Court
The Constitutional Court consists of nine judges, out of which four are selected by the House of Representatives of the Federation of Bosnia and Herzegovina, two are selected by National Assembly of the Republic of Srpska, and the remaining three members are selected by the President of the European Court of Human Rights after consultation with the Presidency of Bosnia and Herzegovina (Article VI.1.a). 
 
The Constitution also states (Article VI.1.b) that the judges must be "distinguished jurists of high moral standing", and that any eligible voter so qualified may serve as a judge of the Constitutional Court. The judges selected by the President of the European Court of Human Rights cannot be citizens of Bosnia and Herzegovina or of any neighbouring state.

The term of judges that were initially appointed was five years, and were not eligible for reappointment. Judges subsequently appointed could serve until age 70, unless they resigned or were removed for cause by consensus of the other judges. The Constitution also states that for appointments made more than five years after the initial appointment of judges, the Parliamentary Assembly could provide by law for a different method of selection of the three judges selected by the President of the European Court of Human Rights, however it has still not changed that.

The Constitution does not require the proportionality of the "constituent peoples" in the Court, however a constitutional custom developed by which a Constitutional court should have two judges from every of the constituent peoples (Bosniaks, Serbs and Croats), besides the three foreign judges.

Current composition of the Court:
Valerija Galić (2002, president 2012–2015, vice-president 2015–2022, president 2022–)
Miodrag Simović (2003, president 2009–2012, vice-president since 2021)
Mirsad Ćeman (2008, president 2015–2018, vice-president since 2018)
Zlatko M. Knežević (2011, vice-president 2015–2018, president 2018–2021)
Seada Palavrić (2005, president 2008–2009)
Helen Keller (2020, vice-president since 2022)
Angelika Nussberger (2020)
Ledi Bianku (2022)

Former Judges:
Mato Tadić (2002–2022, president 2003–2006, vice-president 2015–2021, president 2021–2022)
Hatidža Hadžiosmanović (2002–2008, vice-president 2005–2006, president 2006–2008)
Tudor Panțîru (/, 2002–2022) 
Margarita Caca-Nikolovska (2011–2020, vice-president 2015–2020)
Giovanni Grasso (2016–2020)
Constance Grewe (2004–2016)
David Feldman (2002–2011)
Joseph Marko (1997–2002)
Louis Favoreu (1997–2002)

The way the judges are selected has created controversies over the years. Since there are no other criteria or formal guidelines besides the criteria that judges should be "distinguished jurists of high moral standing", this has led to a situation that it is easier to become a judge of the national constitutional court then the judge of a lower court, since that position has more requirements and specific process of vetting. Also, political influence has a great part in the appointment of judges, so persons with very active political carriers have been chosen by the parliaments of entities, like the current judges Seada Palavrić and Mirsad Ćeman (former longtime members of SDA party) or Krstan Simić (member of SNSD party before his selection). Judge Krstan Simić was subsequently dismissed from the Court by the consensus of other judges, because of his controversial correspondence with his former party leader.

Notable decisions

Decision on the constituency of peoples is the landmark case of the Constitutional Court of Bosnia and Herzegovina, instituted for an evaluation of the consistency of the Constitution of the Republika Srpska and the Constitution of the Federation of Bosnia and Herzegovina with the Constitution of Bosnia and Herzegovina. The four partial decisions were made in a year 2000, by which many of articles of the constitutions of entities were found to be unconstitutional, which had a great impact on politics of Bosnia and Herzegovina, because there was a need to adjust the current state in the country with the decision of the Court. There was a narrow majority (5-4), in the favor of the applicant.

The formal name of this item is U-5/98, but it is widely known as the "Decision on the constituency of peoples", referring to the Court's interpretation of the significance of the phrase "constituent peoples" used in the Preamble of the Constitution of Bosnia and Herzegovina. The decision was also the basis for other notable cases that came before the court.

See also
Constitution
Constitutionalism
Constitutional economics
Jurisprudence
Judiciary
Rule of law
Rule According to Higher Law

References

External links
Constitutional Court of Bosnia and Herzegovina
Constitution of Bosnia and Herzegovina

Law of Bosnia and Herzegovina
Bosnia
Bosnia and Herzegovina
Courts and tribunals established in 1964
1964 establishments in Yugoslavia